Rustam Jamshidovich Soirov (born 12 September 2002) is a Tajikistani professional football player who currently plays for Lokomotiv Tashkent.

Career

Club
On 2 August 2022, Istiklol announced that Soirov had left the club to join Levadia Tallinn on a three-year contract.

On 23 December 2022, Lokomotiv Tashkent announced the signing of Soirov to a two-year contract.

International
Soirov made his senior team debut on 7 November 2020 against Bahrain.

Career statistics

Club

International

Statistics accurate as of match played 25 September 2022

Honors
Istiklol
 Tajik League (2): 2020, 2021
 Tajik Supercup (3): 2020, 2021, 2022

Tajikistan
King's Cup: 2022

References

2002 births
Living people
Tajikistani footballers
Tajikistan international footballers
Association football forwards
Tajikistan youth international footballers
Expatriate footballers in Estonia
Tajikistani expatriate footballers